Thynnoidea is a superfamily of hymenopterans in the order Hymenoptera. There are at least 2 families and about 10 described species in Thynnoidea.

Families
These two families belong to the superfamily Thynnoidea:
 Chyphotidae (chyphotid wasps)
 Thynnidae (thynnid wasps)

References

Further reading

External links

 

Apocrita
Apocrita superfamilies